Casey Sayles (born September 4, 1995) is an American football defensive tackle for the Winnipeg Blue Bombers of the Canadian Football League (CFL). He played college football with the Ohio Bobcats.Married to Katie Nelson from Regina,SK

High school career
Sayles attended Omaha North High School in Omaha, Nebraska. As a senior, Sayles compiled 36 solo tackles and 40 assists, with 19 tackles for loss for 71 yards, including 4 1/2 sacks. He also registered four pass breakups, and while playing tight end, he caught nine passes for 145 yards and two touchdowns. He helped Omaha North reach the Class A championship game and was named to the All-Nebraska team. Sayles signed with the Ohio Bobcats out of high school.

College career
Sayles played Defensive line for the Ohio Bobcats from 2013 to 2016. In 2013, he also played Special teams and returned 4 kicks for a total of 30 yards. In 2014, he played in only seven games. In his senior season in 2016, Sayles has 33 tackles and six sacks, earning Second-team All-Mid-American Conference honors. He finished his four year college career with 111 total tackles and 12.5 sacks and three fumble recoveries in 50 games.

Defense & Fumbles

Professional career

Los Angeles Rams
On May 3, 2017, Sayles was signed by the Los Angeles Rams as an undrafted free agent. He was released by the team on September 3, 2017.

Pittsburgh Steelers
On January 18, 2018, the Pittsburgh Steelers signed Sayles to a Reserve/Future contract. He had four tackles in four preseason games. On September 1, 2018 he was waived.

Birmingham Iron
In 2019, Sayles played for the Birmingham Iron of the Alliance of American Football (AAF). According to Pro Football Focus, he was one of the best defensive lineman in the league on a per-snap basis. The league ceased operations in April 2019.

Pittsburgh Steelers (second stint)
On April 9, 2019, the Pittsburgh Steelers signed Sayles to a one-year contract. On August 30, 2019 he was released.

St. Louis BattleHawks
In October 2019, Sayles was drafted by the St. Louis BattleHawks via the 2020 XFL Draft. He was picked up in the first round of Phase 3: Defensive Front Seven. He had his contract terminated when the league suspended operations on April 10, 2020.

Winnipeg Blue Bombers
Sayles signed with the Winnipeg Blue Bombers of the CFL on April 5, 2021.

References

External links
Twitter

1995 births
Living people
American football defensive tackles
Ohio Bobcats football players
Los Angeles Rams players
Pittsburgh Steelers players
Birmingham Iron players
St. Louis BattleHawks players
Omaha North High School alumni
Winnipeg Blue Bombers players